Saint Paul University, also referred to by its acronym SPUD or SPU Dumaguete, is a private Roman Catholic research non-profit coeducational basic and higher education institution run by the Sisters of Saint Paul of Chartres in Dumaguete, Philippines. It was founded by the Paulinian Sisters on October 29, 1904.

It is one of 40 schools owned, managed, and operated by the Sisters of Saint Paul of Chartres (SPC) in the Philippines. It offers basic, undergraduate and graduate education.

Origins and history
The university traces its origins to the coming of the Sisters of Saint Paul of Chartres (SPC) to the Philippines. On October 29, 1904, the said sisters who came from Vietnam arrived in the Philippines and established the first Saint Paul's school in the Philippines in Dumaguete, Negros Oriental. The seven sisters were Mother Marthe de Saint Paul, Superior Sr. Marie Louise du Sacre Coeur Sr. Ange Marie Sr. Anne de la Croix Sr. Charles de Genes Sr. Catherine, and Sr. Josephine.  The institution they established initially offered elementary education. High school was offered starting in 1920. The first high school graduation took place in 1925. Collegiate courses were offered years later. For many years, the institution operated as Saint Paul College of Dumaguete. In 2004, the year of its centennial celebration, the college was granted university status becoming one of the four universities in Dumaguete.

January 9, 1905, the new school opened with 30 girls (15 of whom were aged 15 to 20), four of them boarders, and six boys. Children, women, and young men came to the school for religious instruction. Besides the regular academic courses, there were supplementary ones in music, drawing, painting, French, sewing, and embroidery. The medium of instruction was English. However, since the Americans had been in the Philippines for only five years, very few pupils were acquainted with the language. Hence, the Sisters were obliged to learn Visayan and Spanish to be able to communicate with their charges.

Academic programs

Postgraduate 
Doctor of Education (Ed. D.) 
Doctor in Business Administration (DBA) 
Doctor in Public Administration (DPA) 
Master of Arts in Education (M.A.) 
Master of Arts in Nursing (M.A.N.) 
Master in Business Administration (M.B.A.) 
Master in Public Administration (M.P.A.) 
Diploma in Public Management (D.P.M.) 
Master in Information Technology (M.I.T.) 
Master of Science in Information Technology (M.S.I.T.) 
Master of Arts in Religious Education (M.A.R.E.)
Master in Business Administration (M.B.A.) major in Tourism & HRM
M.S. Environmental Management Studies ( MSES)
Master of Art in Mass Communication

Undergraduate
College of Arts and Education
 Bachelor of Arts 
 Mass Communication
 Bachelor of Science in Psychology 
 Bachelor of Elementary Education
 Bachelor of Special Education 
 Bachelor of Early Childhood Education
 Bachelor of Culture & Arts Education
 Bachelor of Physical Education
 Bachelor of Secondary Education
 Math
 English
 Science
 Values & Religious  Education
 Social Studies/ Social Sciences

College of Business and Information Technology
 Bachelor of Science in Accountancy BSA
 Bachelor of Science in Internal Audit  BSIA
 Bachelor of Science in Business Administration BSBA
 Bachelor of Science in Hospitality Management BSHM
 Bachelor of Science in Information Technology  BSIT
 Bachelor of Science in Management Accounting   BSMA
 Bachelor of Science in Tourism Management BSTM
 Bachelor of Science in Entrepreneurship (BSE)
 Certificate in Environmental Management
 Associate in Tourism
 Associate in Hotel & Restaurant Management

College of Nursing
 Bachelor of Science in Nursing

Basic Education
Senior High
Grade 11
Grade 12
 Junior High
Grades 1-6
 Kinder
 Nursery (Preschool)

Source:

See also
St. Paul University Philippines, Tuguegarao City
St. Paul University Manila, Metro Manila
St. Paul University Quezon City, Metro Manila
St. Paul University at San Miguel, Bulacan
St. Paul University Iloilo, Iloilo City
St. Paul University Surigao, Surigao del Norte

References

External links
 
 
 Saint Paul University, Surigao
 Saint Paul University, Quezon City

Catholic universities and colleges in the Philippines
Universities and colleges in Negros Oriental
Education in Dumaguete